Os Blancos is a municipality in Ourense in the Galicia region of north-west Spain. It is located in the south of the province.

References  

Municipalities in the Province of Ourense